Larzdeh is a village in Kharajgil Rural District, Asalem District, Talesh County, Gilan Province, Iran. At the 2006 census, its population was 8, in 4 families.

References 

Populated places in Talesh County